Muhammad Farooq Azam Malik is a Pakistani politician who had been a member of the National Assembly of Pakistan from August 2018 till January 2023.

Political career
He was elected to the National Assembly of Pakistan from Constituency NA-170 (Bahawalpur-I) as a candidate of Pakistan Tehreek-e-Insaf in General Election, 2018.

External Link

More Reading
 List of members of the 15th National Assembly of Pakistan

References

Living people
Saraiki people
National Awami Party politicians
Pakistan People's Party politicians
Pakistan Tehreek-e-Insaf politicians
Pakistan Tehreek-e-Insaf MNAs
Pakistani MNAs 2018–2023
Year of birth missing (living people)